Francis Newport may refer to:

Francis Newport (fl. 1559), MP for Droitwich
Francis Newport (died 1623) (c. 1555–1623), MP for Shropshire
Francis Newport, 1st Earl of Bradford (1620–1708), English soldier, courtier and politician